The Inverness Invitational Four-Ball was a golf tournament on the PGA Tour from 1935 to 1953. It was played at the Inverness Club in Toledo, Ohio.

Format
The tournament featured an unusual team round robin format. From 1935 to 1951, the field consisted of eight two-man teams. They would play seven rounds totalling 126 holes in four-ball format. A team earned or lost points on each hole, in a match play style, based on their score versus the opposing team for that round. A team scored "+1" for each hole won and "−1" for each hole lost. The teams were shuffled after every round so that every team played one round against every other team. The team with the most points after seven rounds won.

In 1952, the field was six teams and they played over five rounds for a total of 90 holes.

In 1953, the format shifted to traditional 72-hole stroke play with a field of 30 players.

The women's invitational replaced the men's event in 1954.

Winners
Inverness Invitational
1953 Jack Burke Jr.

Inverness Invitational Four-Ball
1952 Jim Ferrier and Sam Snead
1951 Roberto De Vicenzo and Henry Ransom
1950 Jim Ferrier and Sam Snead
1949 Bob Hamilton and Chick Harbert
1948 Jimmy Demaret and Ben Hogan
1947 Jimmy Demaret and Ben Hogan
1946 Jimmy Demaret and Ben Hogan
1943–1945 No tournament due to World War II
1942 Lawson Little and Lloyd Mangrum
1941 Jimmy Demaret and Ben Hogan
1940 Ralph Guldahl and Sam Snead
1939 Henry Picard and Johnny Revolta
1938 Vic Ghezzi and Sam Snead
1937 Harry Cooper and Horton Smith
1936 Walter Hagen and Ky Laffoon
1935 Henry Picard and Johnny Revolta

References

External links
Inverness Club official site
List of winners at Inverness Club official site

Former PGA Tour events
Golf in Ohio
Sports in Toledo, Ohio
Sports competitions in Ohio
Recurring sporting events established in 1935
Recurring sporting events disestablished in 1953
1935 establishments in Ohio
1953 disestablishments in Ohio